Sera Waters is a South Australian textile artist, arts writer, and arts educator. She lectures at Adelaide Central School of Art.

Biography
Sera Waters was born in Murray Bridge, South Australia, in 1979. She has a Bachelor of Visual Arts (Hons) from the University of South Australia, a Masters of Visual Arts from the University of Adelaide, and a PhD from the University of South Australia. She received the Ruth Tuck Scholarship in 2005 and used it to undertake study at the Royal School of Needlework in the UK. She lectures in art history at Adelaide Central School of Art.

Artistic style and subject 

Waters specialises in textile arts and techniques, such as embroidery. Waters’ blackwork is considered her signature technique.  In her PhD thesis, she used textile arts to explore family genealogy.  Her works have been described as deeply conceptual, witty, and using humble needlework to encompass worlds of concern. As well as examining the colonial experience through her art, she is concerned with practicing art on Aboriginal land and the impact of colonisation. She is also interested in textiles arts embodying labour and time.

Awards, residencies and scholarships

 Ruth Tuck Scholarship 2006, Carclew
 Heysen Prize for Landscape, 2016, Hahndorf Academy
 The Hill Smith Gallery / University of South Australia Postgraduate Award, 2018, Helpmann Academy
 Finalist, Ramsay Art Prize, 2019, Art Gallery of South Australia

Collections
 Art Gallery of South Australia
 Cruthers Collection of Women’s Art (see PDF of works held)

Bibliography

By Waters

 Lawrence, Kay, Waters, Sera, & Belfrage, Clare. 2018, Clare Belfrage : rhythms of necessity, Wakefield Press, Mile End, South Australia. Worldcat record
 Waters, Sera Jaye. 2006. Invoking disaster : visions of the monstrous and catastrophic in Japanese visual culture from the Edo and postwar periods. Thesis. University of Adelaide.
 Waters, Sera. 2007. Valuing relationships: Concertina. Artlink, Vol. 27, No. 4, 39-41
 Waters, Sera. 2012. Repetitive crafting: The shared aesthetic of time in Australian contemporary art. craft+design enquiry, 4, 69-87. 
 Waters, Sera. 2015. Inside the Outback: An Exploration of Domesticated Landscapes in Semco’s Long Stitch Originals Series of the 1980s. craft+design enquiry, 7, (2015): 27-48. 
 Waters, Sera. 2015. Knotted Lines: Entangling genealogical methodology with practice-led research. ACUADS 2015 Annual Conference. Australian Council of University Art and Design Schools.
 Waters, Sera. 2018. Genealogical ghostscapes : unsettling settler colonial home-making legacies in South Australia. Thesis. University of South Australia. 
 Waters, Sera. 2020. Crafty prepping. Artlink, Vol. 40, No. 1, Mar 2020: 20-27.

About Waters

 Adams, Jude. Three artists - in the world: Anne Kay, Irmina van Niele, Sera Waters. Artlink, Vol. 29, No. 2, Jun 2009: 89. 
 Clarke, K. 2016. Willful knitting? Contemporary Australian craftivism and feminist histories. Continuum, 30(3), 298-306. 
 Coleman, Sheridan. Dark Portals: Sera Waters. Art Monthly Australia, no.264, Oct 2013: 39-42. 
 Hart, Sheridan. 2018. Sera Waters unpicks the long stitches of Australian history. Art Guide Australia.
 Kelly, Miriam. 2017. Sera Waters: Domestic arts. Artlink, 37(4), 48–55.

Exhibition catalogues

 Capone, Jacobus & Thwaites, Vivonne & Garnaut, Christine & Collins, Julie & Fazakerley, Ruth, 1965- et al. (2012). Build me a city : an exploration of the archives of the Architecture Museum, UniSA by seven artists. Architecture Museum and Australian Experimental Art Foundation, Adelaide, S. Aust.
 Purvis, Andrew. 2020. "Drastic Fabric". Adelaide Central School of Art.
 Waters, Sera, Nowell, Liz, & Kelly, Miriam. 2017. Sera Waters: Domestic arts. ACE Open. Worldcat record

References

 

 

Living people 

Artists from South Australia 

Australian contemporary artists 

People from Adelaide 

20th-century Australian artists 

21st-century Australian artists 

Australian art teachers 

1979 births
Australian embroiderers